Francisco Anderson Huaiquipán Castillo (born 10 October 1978) is a former Chilean footballer.

Football career
In 1996, he debuted for Magallanes aged 18. After six seasons played there and a loan spell at Provincial Osorno, he joined ―on loan too― to Chilean powerhouse Colo-Colo in 2002. There, he helped the team to win the Torneo Clausura in June. However, in January 2003, he can't renovate his loan with the team, so that he returned Magallanes having to play in the Primera B de Chile (second-tier) all its 2003 season.

On 11 May 2002, it occurred one of his most important events when he scored a twice in the 3–0 home win over rivals Universidad de Chile at Estadio Monumental David Arellano. Likewise, still is regarded his performance where he show his skills in a friendly match against Leeds United at Melbourne that Colo-Colo lost 1–0 with score of Harry Kewell. According Mario Cáceres ―then Colo-Colo footballer― Huaiquipán impressed to the Englishmen.

On 16 February 2003, he was linked to Colón de Santa Fe, nevertheless, he failed to join to the Sabaleros. Then, after not renewing with Colo-Colo, the team announced that they will re–contract him in 2004.

In July 2004, he moved to Mexico after a failed incorporation to South Korean football. After unsuccessful seasons (2004–2006), he joined to Primera B team Santiago Morning in 2007, where being a key player, reached the promotion alongside the club.

In 2009, he left Santiago Morning and returned to second-tier, signing for Deportes Antofagasta. On 30 June, he was sent-off during the derby against San Marcos de Arica, team managed by Hernán Godoy, his former coach in Unión San Felipe. After his departure from Antofagasta, it was roumured about his arrival to then Municipal Iquique, freshly relegated team from the Primera División de Chile.

On 7 January 2010, he joined San Marcos de Arica aged 31, reuninting with Godoy, his former coach. His spell at Arica-based side was brief because Godoy marginated him from the team on 16 March due to discipline problems. Time later, he returned to Santiago Morning in July to play the 2010 Primera Division de Chile championship.

Retirement
In 2011, after an unsuccessful contract with Indonesian club Persik Kediri, he finally retired from football aged 32.

Since his retirement from football, he generally has participated at reality shows as well as in prime time programs of different Chilean television channels. Noteworthy, Huaiquipán has been object of several controversial moments.

He returned to the football activity in 2018 after joining Brazilian club Artsul in the Campeonato Carioca.

Media career
In February 2013, he appeared in Viña del Mar International Song Festival gala.

Mundos Opuestos
On 6 January 2012, it was confirmed that Huaiquipán reached an agreement with Canal 13 to participate in then new reality show alongside other nine famous people from Chilean television. On 15 January, shortly after winning the inicial competence to pass to the future, he was named by his partners as captain of the «Eternity team». As time passed, Huaiquipán established a close camaraderie with his team, specially with Mario Moreno, Marcelo Marrochino and Tony Kamo. Nevertheless, he had also strong confrontations with Juan Lacassie (nicknamed «Chispa»), a professional skateboarder from a wealthy family based in Las Condes, middle–high/high–class commune of Santiago. On 27 January, they nearly fought to blows after «Chispa» strongly insulted him with classists epithets.

During February 2012's second week, Huaiquipán tried to escape several times from the reality's confinement located in Pirque, because he missed his family. Finally, on 20 February, it was revealed that he resigned to the reality. On 22 February, after winning his last competence, he officially left Mundos Opuestos. The next day, he declared in an interview that: «If return I will make to win». Days later, there were rumours in the press that he would re-join to the reality, receiving thrice more than his old salary.

Problems with the Law
In September 2021, Huaiquipán was arrested trying to enter drugs into the Colina Penitentiary Compliance Center. After being formalized for the crime of drug trafficking, the Colina Guarantee Court ordered to leave him in preventive detention

Honours

Club
Colo-Colo
 Primera División de Chile (1): 2002 Clausura

References

External links
 
 Francisco Huaiquipán at Football-Lineups

1978 births
Living people
Footballers from Santiago
Chilean footballers
Chilean expatriate footballers
Chilean people of Mapuche descent
Mapuche sportspeople
Indigenous sportspeople of the Americas
Magallanes footballers
Deportes Magallanes footballers
Provincial Osorno footballers
Colo-Colo footballers
Atlante F.C. footballers
Everton de Viña del Mar footballers
Unión San Felipe footballers
Rangers de Talca footballers
Santiago Morning footballers
C.D. Antofagasta footballers
San Marcos de Arica footballers
Persik Kediri players
Artsul Futebol Clube players
Primera B de Chile players
Chilean Primera División players
Ascenso MX players
Indonesian Premier Division players
Chilean expatriate sportspeople in Mexico
Chilean expatriate sportspeople in Indonesia
Chilean expatriate sportspeople in Brazil
Expatriate footballers in Mexico
Expatriate footballers in Indonesia
Expatriate footballers in Brazil
Association football midfielders
Chilean television personalities